Adnan Adıvar (1882 – 1 July 1955), also known as Adnan Bey, was a Turkish politician, writer, historian, and by profession a medical doctor. He undertook original research and wrote on the history of science. He was also an early supporter of the nascent feminist movement.

Biography
He was born in Gelibolu (Gallipoli) 6 October 1882, and his family tree included Aziz Mahmud Hüdayi, a 17th-century Sufi leader who lived in Üsküdar district of Istanbul. Adıvar's father, Mektubizade Bahai Efendi, was a jurist, and his grandfather, Abdülaziz Efendi, was a member of the Encümen-i Daniş, the first Ottoman science academy. Adıvar was first schooled at the Numune-i Terakki Mektebi (literally, the “School of Exemplary Progress”) before he enrolled at the Dersaadet Idadisi (today's Vefa High School).

Graduated from the Medical Faculty in 1905, Adıvar left for Berlin to specialize in internal medicine. Following the proclamation of the 2nd Constitution at 1908, he came back to Istanbul. As he was close to the Young Turks (Jeunes Turcs), he was appointed as the director of the Medical Faculty at the age of 30. He served in the Red Crescent during the Italo-Turkish War against Italians in Tripoli, participated in the Balkan Wars and World War I. In 1917 he married the novelist Halide Edip, who was at the time teaching in Lebaonon, and both joined the team of Mustafa Kemal Atatürk in 1918 when foreign armies occupied Istanbul. In Ankara, Adnan Adıvar was named Minister of Health, Ministry of Internal Affairs and the vice president of the National Assembly between 1920 and 1923.

He was one of the intellectuals within Mustafa Kemal Atatürk's circle, active in the Turkish War of Independence with his wife, the author Halide Edib Adıvar. He avoided arrest from the occupying British in Istanbul, who were making a sweep of all Ottoman intellectuals and deporting them to Malta at the end of World War I, by joining the Kemalist forces in Anatolia.

Later he parted ways with Atatürk, disagreeing with the new direction the young republic was taking. He opposed the powers given to Atatürk by the parliament, fearing he was going to be a dictator. He joined the short-lived opposition party "Terakkiperver Cumhuriyet Fırkası" (Progressive Republican Party), and his name was later associated with an attempt on Atatürk's life in 1926 while he was abroad. Even though he was cleared, he stayed in exile until 1939.

Following the proclamation of the Republic, he founded in 1924 the opposition party Progressive Republican Party (Turkish: Terakkiperver Cumhuriyet Fırkası) with  Ali Fuat Cebesoy, Kâzım Karabekir, Refet Bele and Rauf Orbay. He became the secretary general and did not hesitate to criticize the government. The party was abolished in 1925 on the argument that it backed Sheikh Said Rebellion against the government. Disappointed, after a year of serving as an independent representative, Adıvar left for Vienna to accompany his wife who needed to undergo medical treatment. Allegation of his involvement in an attempt on Atatürk's life made him extend his stay abroad, where he seems to have developed an interest in philosophy and history of science.

He directed publication of the Turkish edition of the Encyclopaedia of Islam, contributing its introduction and a number of articles. His other significant publication is La Science Chez les Turks Ottomans (Paris, 1939), which can be regarded as a first attempt to present together the activities and accomplishments of Turkish scholars during the Ottoman period, 14th to 19th centuries. His other works include a Turkish translation of Bertrand Russell's Philosophical Matters (1936), a two-volume work in Turkish on science and religion through history, and many essays and articles on cultural and scientific topics.

After his return to Turkey in 1938, he held various government and parliamentary positions in the early years of the Turkish Republic. He founded the Eastern Studies Society. He was a deputy in the first Turkish Parliament in 1920 and again elected there for the 1946-1950 session as a member of the Democratic Party.

Adnan Adıvar died on 1 July 1955 in Istanbul and was laid to rest at the Merkezefendi Cemetery.

References

External links

1882 births
1955 deaths
Political people from the Ottoman Empire
Vefa High School alumni
Turkish writers
20th-century Turkish physicians
Progressive Republican Party (Turkey) politicians
Burials at Merkezefendi Cemetery
Istanbul University Faculty of Medicine alumni
Humboldt University of Berlin alumni
Deputies of Istanbul
Turkish feminists
Physicians from the Ottoman Empire